Eugenia angustissima, also known as  very fine leafed cherry, cerejinha de folhas finíssimas, cereja de folhas finíssimas, guamirim folha de agulha, is a flowering shrub in the family Myrtaceae.

Distribution
Eugenia angustissima is native to Bolivia, Paraguay and Brazil, mainly in the Cerrado and Caatinga regions, including but not exclusive to the states of Bahia, Goias, Sao Paulo, Minas Gerais, Tocantins, Mato Grosso and Mato Grosso do Sul.

References

angustissima